This is a list of compositions by Frédéric Chopin by genre. There is a separate list by opus number.

Most of Chopin's compositions were for solo piano, though he did compose two piano concertos as well as some other music for ensembles.

His larger scale works such as sonatas, the four scherzi, the four ballades, the Fantaisie in F minor, Op. 49, and the Barcarolle in F major, Op. 60 have cemented a solid place within the piano repertoire, as have his shorter works: the polonaises, mazurkas, waltzes, impromptus and nocturnes.

Two important collections are the Études, Op. 10 and 25 (which are a staple of that genre for pianists), and the 24 Preludes, Op. 28 (a cycle of short pieces paired in a major key/relative minor key pattern following the circle of fifths in clockwise steps).  Also, Chopin wrote numerous song settings of Polish texts, and chamber pieces including a piano trio and a cello sonata.

This listing uses the traditional opus numbers where they apply; other works are identified by numbers from the catalogues of Maurice J. E. Brown (B), Krystyna Kobylańska (KK), Józef Michał Chomiński (A, C, D, E, P, S), and Jan Ekier (WN, Dbop.).

Piano solo

Ballades 

 Op. 23: Ballade No. 1 in G minor (composed 1835–36)
 Op. 38: Ballade No. 2 in F major (1836–39)
 Op. 47: Ballade No. 3 in A major (1841)
 Op. 52: Ballade No. 4 in F minor (1842–43)

Études 

Nicknames have been given to most of Chopin's Études over time, but Chopin himself never used nicknames for these pieces, nor did he name them.
 Op. 10, 12 Études:
 Étude in C major (1830)
 Étude in A minor (1830) 
 Étude in E major (1832)
 Étude in C minor (1832)
 Étude in G major (1830)
 Étude in E minor (1830)
 Étude in C major (1832) 
 Étude in F major (1829) 
 Étude in F minor (1829) 
 Étude in A major (1829)
 Étude in E major (1829)
 Étude in C minor (1831)
 Op. 25, 12 Études:
 Étude in A major (1836)
 Étude in F minor (1836)
 Étude in F major (1836)
 Étude in A minor (1832–1834)
 Étude in E minor (1832–1834)
 Étude in G minor (1832–1834) 
 Étude in C minor (1836)
 Étude in D major (1832–1834)
 Étude in G major (1832–1834)
 Étude in B minor (1832–1834)
 Étude in A minor (1834)
 Étude in C minor (1836)
 Trois nouvelles études (1839; Dbop. 36A, B, C):
  Étude in F minor
  Étude in A major
  Étude in D major

Impromptus 
 Op. 29: Impromptu No. 1 in A major (1837)
 Op. 36: Impromptu No. 2 in F major (1839)
 Op. 51: Impromptu No. 3 in G major (1843)

 Op. 66 (posth.); WN 46: Fantaisie-Impromptu in C minor (1834/1835)

Mazurkas 

 Op. 6, Four Mazurkas (1830–32)
 Mazurka in F minor
 Mazurka in C minor
 Mazurka in E major
 Mazurka in E minor

 Op. 7, Five Mazurkas (1830–32)
 Mazurka in B major
 Mazurka in A minor (1829, revised 1830)
 Mazurka in F minor
 Mazurka in A major (1824, revised 1830)
 Mazurka in C major

 Op. 17, Four Mazurkas (1833)
 Mazurka in B major
 Mazurka in E minor
 Mazurka in A major
 Mazurka in A minor

 Op. 24, Four Mazurkas (1835)
 Mazurka in G minor
 Mazurka in C major
 Mazurka in A major
 Mazurka in B minor

 Op. 30, Four Mazurkas (1837)
 Mazurka in C minor
 Mazurka in B minor
 Mazurka in D major
 Mazurka in C minor

 Op. 33, Four Mazurkas (1838)
 Mazurka in G minor
 Mazurka in D major
 Mazurka in C major
 Mazurka in B minor

 Op. 41, Four Mazurkas (1839–40)
 Mazurka in C minor
 Mazurka in E minor
 Mazurka in B major
 Mazurka in A major

 Mazurka in A minor (No. 50; "Notre Temps"; 1840; pub. 1841 in Six morceaux de salon, without Op. number; B. 134; KK IIb/4; S 2/4; Dbop. 42A)

 Mazurka in A minor  (No. 51; "Émile Gaillard"; 1840; pub. 1841 in Album de pianistes polonais, without Op. number; B. 140; KK IIb/5; S 2/5; Dbop. 42B)

 Op. 50, Three Mazurkas (1842)
 Mazurka in G major
 Mazurka in A major
 Mazurka in C minor

 Op. 56, Three Mazurkas (1844)
 Mazurka in B major
 Mazurka in C major
 Mazurka in C minor

 Op. 59, Three Mazurkas (1845–46)
 Mazurka in A minor
 Mazurka in A major
 Mazurka in F minor

 Op. 63, Three Mazurkas (1846-7)
 Mazurka in B major
 Mazurka in F minor
 Mazurka in C minor

Published in Poland during early years 
 Two Mazurkas (unnumbered; 1826; pub. 1826, without an Op. number; B. 16, KK IIa/2-3, S 1, No. 2):
 a. Mazurka in G major (WN 8)
 b. Mazurka in B major (WN 7)

Posthumously published

With opus numbers 
 Op. posth. 67, Four Mazurkas (Nos. 42–45; pub. 1855):
 Mazurka in G major (1833; WN 26)
 Mazurka in G minor (1849; WN 64)
 Mazurka in C major (1835; WN 48)
 Mazurka in A minor (1846; WN 60)
 Op. posth. 68, Four Mazurkas (Nos. 46–49; pub. 1855):
 Mazurka in C major (1829; WN 24)
 Mazurka in A minor  (1827; WN 14)
 Mazurka in F major  (1829; WN 25)
 Mazurka in F minor  (1849; WN 65; Last composition)

Without opus numbers 
 Mazurka in C major (1833; pub. 1870; B. 82; KK IVB/3; P. 2/3)
 Mazurka in D major (1829; pub. 1875; B. 31/71; KK IVa/7; P. 1/7)
 Mazurka in B major (1832; pub. 1909; B. 73; KK IVb/1; P. 2/1; WN 41)
 Mazurka in D major "Mazurek" (doubtful, 1820?; pub. 1910; B. 4; KK Anh Ia/1; A. 1/1)
 Mazurka in A major (1834; pub. 1930; B. 85; KK IVb/4; P. 2/4; WN 45)
 Mazurka in D major (1832; pub. ?; P. 2/2)

Nocturnes 

 Op. 9, Three Nocturnes (1830–32):
 Nocturne in B minor
 Nocturne in E major
 Nocturne in B major
 Op. 15, Three Nocturnes (1830–33):
 Nocturne in F major
 Nocturne in F major
 Nocturne in G minor
 Op. 27, Two Nocturnes (1835-6):
 Nocturne in C minor
 Nocturne in D major
 Op. 32, Two Nocturnes (1836–37):
 Nocturne in B major
 Nocturne in A major
 Op. 37, Two Nocturnes (1838–40):
 Nocturne in G minor
 Nocturne in G major
 Op. 48, Two Nocturnes (1840–41):
 Nocturne in C minor
 Nocturne in F minor
 Op. 55, Two Nocturnes (1843–44):
 Nocturne in F minor
 Nocturne in E major
 Op. 62, Two Nocturnes (1846):
 Nocturne in B major
 Nocturne in E major

Posthumously published

With opus numbers 
 Op. posth. 72 (No. 2 and No. 3 are works other than Nocturnes); WN 23:
 Nocturne in E minor (1827–29)

Without opus numbers 
 P. 1/16; WN 37: Nocturne in C minor, Lento con gran espressione (1830)
 P. 2/8; WN 62: Nocturne in C minor (1837)
 A. 1/6: Nocturne in C minor (Nocturne oubliée) (spurious)

Polonaises 

 Op. 26, Two Polonaises (1833–36)
 Polonaise in C minor
 Polonaise in E minor
 Op. 40, Two Polonaises (1838–40)
 Polonaise in A major
 Polonaise in C minor
 Op. 44: Polonaise in F minor (1840–41)
 Op. 53: Polonaise in A major (1842–43)
 Op. 61: Polonaise-Fantaisie in A major (1846)

Published in Poland during early years 
 KK IIa No. 1; WN 2: Polonaise in G minor (1817; First composition)

Posthumously published

With opus numbers 
 Op. posth. 71, Three Polonaises:
 Polonaise in D minor (1825; WN 11)
 Polonaise in B major (1828; WN 17)
 Polonaise in F minor (1828; WN 12)

Without opus numbers 
 KK IVa, Five Polonaises:
 Polonaise in B major (1817; WN 1)
 Polonaise in A major (1821; WN 3)
 Polonaise in G minor (1822; WN 4)
 Polonaise in B minor, Adieu à Guillaume Kolberg (1826; WN 10)
 Polonaise in G major (1829; WN 35)

Preludes 

 Op. 28, 24 Preludes:
 Prelude in C major (composed 1839)
 Prelude in A minor (1838)
 Prelude in G major (1838–1839)
 Prelude in E minor (1838)
 Prelude in D major (1838–1839)
 Prelude in B minor (1838–1839)
 Prelude in A major (1836)
 Prelude in F minor (1838–1839)
 Prelude in E major (1838–1839)
 Prelude in C minor (1838–1839)
 Prelude in B major (1838–1839)
 Prelude in G minor (1838–1839)
 Prelude in F major (1838–1839)
 Prelude in E minor (1838–1839)
 Prelude in D major (1838–1839)
 Prelude in B minor (1838–1839)
 Prelude in A major (1836)
 Prelude in F minor (1838–1839)
 Prelude in E major (1838–1839)
 Prelude in C minor (1838–1839)
 Prelude in B major (1838–1839)
 Prelude in G minor (1838–1839)
 Prelude in F major (1838–1839)
 Prelude in D minor (1838–1839)
 Op. 45: Prelude in C minor (1841)

Posthumously published 
 P. 2/7; WN 44: Prelude in A major (1834, published 1918; ded. Pierre Wolff)
 Prelude in E minor (recently found)

Rondos 
 Op. 1: Rondo in C minor (1825; arr. piano 4-hands 1834)
 Op. 5: Rondo à la mazur in F major (1826)
 Op. 16: Rondo in E major (1832)

Posthumously published 
 Op. posth. 73; WN 15: Rondo in C major for 2 pianos (1828; arr. piano solo 1840)

Scherzi 

 Op. 20: Scherzo No. 1 in B minor (1831–35)
 Op. 31: Scherzo No. 2 in B minor (1836–37)
 Op. 39: Scherzo No. 3 in C minor (1839–40)
 Op. 54: Scherzo No. 4 in E major (1842–43)

Sonatas 

 Op. 4 (posth.): Piano Sonata No. 1 in C minor (1828; pub. 1851)
 Op. 35: Piano Sonata No. 2 in B minor, Funeral March (1839–40, Funeral March composed 1837)
 Op. 58: Piano Sonata No. 3 in B minor (1844–45)

Variations 

 Op. 2: Variations on "Là ci darem la mano" from Mozart's Don Giovanni for piano and orchestra (1827)
 Op. 12: Variations brillantes in B major on "Je vends des scapulaires" from Hérold's Ludovic (1833)
 B. 113; Dbop. 29A: Variation in E for Hexameron (1837; pub. 1839)

Posthumously published 
 KK. IVa/6: Introduction, Theme and Variations in D on a Venetian air, piano 4-hands (1826; pub 1965)
 B. 12a; WN 5: Variations in D major or B minor on an Irish National Air (from Thomas Moore) for 2 pianos, P. 1/6 (1826)
 B. 14; WN 6: Variations in E major on the air "Der Schweizerbub: Steh'auf, steh'auf o du Schweitzer Bub", a.k.a. Introduction et Variations sur un Lied allemand (1826; pub. 1851)
 B. 37; WN 16: Variations in A, Souvenir de Paganini (1829; pub. 1881)

Lost 
 KK. Ve/9: Variations, (January 1818)
 KK. Vb/2: Variations in F, piano 4-hands or 2 pianos (1826)
 KK. VIIa/3: Variations on a Ukrainian Dumka for violin and piano, by Antoni Radziwill, completed by Chopin (by June 1830)

Waltzes 

 Op. 18: Grande valse brillante in E major (1833)
 Op. 34, Trois grandes valses brillantes:
 Waltz in A major (1835)
 Waltz in A minor (1831)
 Waltz in F major (1838)
 Op. 42: Waltz in A major (1840)
 Op. 64, Three Waltzes:
 Waltz in D major, Minute Waltz (1847)
 Waltz in C minor (1847)
 Waltz in A major (1840, some sources say 1847)

Posthumously published

With opus numbers 
 1852: Two Waltzes, Op. posth. 69:
 Waltz in A major, L'Adieu  (1835; WN 47)
 Waltz in B minor (1829; WN 19)
 1855: Three Waltzes, Op. posth. 70:
 Waltz in G major (1832; WN 42)
 Waltz in F minor (1841; WN 55)
 Waltz in D major (1829; WN 20)

Without opus numbers 
 1868: Waltz in E minor (1830), B. 56, KK IVa/15, P. 1/15, WN 29
 1871–72: Waltz in E major (c. 1830), B. 44, KK IVa/12, P. 1/12, WN 18
 1902: Waltz in A major, B. 21, KK IVa/13, P. 1/13, WN 28
 1902: Waltz in E major, B. 46, KK IVa/14, P. 1/14
 1955: Waltz in A minor (1843–1848), B. 150, KK IVb/11, P. 2/11, WN 63
 1955: Waltz in E major (Sostenuto), B. 133, KK IVb/10, WN 53 (not always classified as a waltz)
 1932: Waltz in F minor, Valse mélancolique, KK Ib/7, A. 1/7. Reattributed to Charles Mayer as Le Régret, Op. 332

Miscellaneous pieces for solo piano 

 Op. 19: Boléro in A minor (1833)
 Op. 22: Andante spianato in G major (1831–4)
 Op. 43: Tarantelle in A major (1841)
 Op. 46: Allegro de Concert in A major (1832–41)
 Op. 49: Fantaisie in F minor (1841)
 Op. 57: Berceuse in D major (1844)
 Op. 60: Barcarolle in F major (1845–46)

Posthumously published

With opus numbers 
 Op. posth. 72:
 Nocturne in E minor (1827; WN 23)
 Marche funèbre in C minor (1827; B.20; WN 9)
 Three Écossaises (1826; B.12; WN 13)
 Écossaise in D major
 Écossaise in G major
 Écossaise in D major

Without opus numbers 
 B. 17; WN 27: Contredanse in G major (doubtful) (1827)
 B. 84; WN 43: Cantabile in B major (1834)
 B. 109: Largo in E major (1837)
 B. 117; WN 52a: Andantino in G minor (arr. of the piano part of the song Wiosna; 5 different MS exist) (1837)
 B. 129a: Canon in F minor (unfinished (1839))
 B. 133; WN 53: Klavierstück in E "Sostenuto" (1840; sometimes classified as a waltz)
 B. 144: Fugue in A minor (1841)
 B. 151; WN 56: Album Leaf (Moderato) in E major (1843)
 B. 160b: 2 Bourrées (1846)
 P. 2/13; WN 59: Galopp in A (Galop Marquis) (1846)
 KK. Vb/1: Andante dolente in B minor (lost)
 KK. Ve/3: Écossaise (? date; lost)
 KK. Vb/9: Écossaise in B major (1827; lost)
 KK. VIIa/2: 3 Fugues (A minor, F major, D minor; arr. from Cherubini's Cours de contrepoint et de fugue)

Piano and orchestra

Concerto 
 Op. 11: Piano Concerto No. 1 in E minor (1830)
 Op. 21: Piano Concerto No. 2 in F minor (1829–1830)

Miscellaneous 
 Op. 2: Variations on "Là ci darem la mano" from Mozart's Don Giovanni, in B major (1827)
 Op. 13: Fantasy on Polish Airs, in A major (1828)
 Op. 14: Rondo à la Krakowiak, in F major (1828)
 Op. 22: Andante spianato et grande polonaise brillante, in E major (1830–1831)

Flute and piano 
 B.9: Variations in E major on "Non più mesta" from Rossini's La Cenerentola, KK. Anh. Ia/5 (? 1824; pub. 1955; spurious)

Cello and piano 
 Op. 3: Introduction and Polonaise brillante in C major (1829–1830)
 B. 70; Dbop. 16: Grand Duo concertant in E major on themes of Meyerbeer's Robert le diable (1832; written jointly with Auguste Franchomme)
 Op. 65: Cello Sonata in G minor (1845–46)

Violin, cello and piano 
 Op. 8: Trio for Violin, Cello and Piano in G minor (1830)

Voice and piano

Posthumously published

With opus numbers 
Op. posth. 74, 17 Songs (1829–1847; Polish)
 "The Wish" ("Życzenie") (1829; WN 21)
 "Spring" ("Wiosna") (1838; WN 52)
 "The Sad River" ("Smutna Rzeka") (1831; WN 39)
 "Merrymaking" ("Hulanka") (1830; WN 32)
 "What She Likes" ("Gdzie lubi") (1829; WN 22)
 "Out of My Sight" ("Precz z moich oczu") (1830; WN 33)
 "The Messenger" ("Poseł") (1830; WN 30)
 "Handsome Lad" ("Śliczny chłopiec") (1841; WN 54)
 "From the Mountains, Where They Carried Heavy Crosses [Melody]" ("Z gór, gdzie dźwigali strasznych krzyżów brzemię [Melodia]") (1847; WN 61)
 "The Warrior" ("Wojak") (1830; WN 34)
 "The Double-End" ("Dwojaki koniec") (1845; WN 58)
 "My Darling" ("Moja pieszczotka") (1837; WN 51)
 "I Want What I Have Not" ("Nie ma czego trzeba") (1845; WN 57)
 "The Ring" ("Pierścień") (1836; WN 50)
 "The Bridegroom" ("Narzeczony") (1831; WN 40)
 "Lithuanian Song" ("Piosnka litewska") (1831; WN 38)
 "Leaves are Falling, Hymn from the Tomb" ("Śpiew z mogiłki") (1836; WN 49)

Without opus numbers 
 "Enchantment" ("Czary") (1830; WN 31)
 "Reverie" ("Dumka") (1840)

Known lost works
 Polonaise for piano, composed 1818. Presented by Chopin to the Empress Maria Feodorowna, mother of the Tsar, on the occasion of her visit to Warsaw on 26 September 1818. 
 Variations for piano, composed 1818. Mentioned in the "Pamietnik Warzawski" of 1818 
 Polonaise 'Barber of Seville' for piano, composed 1825/11. In 1825/11 Chopin wrote to Bialoblocki: "I have done a new Polonaise on the "Barber" which is fairly well liked. I think of sending it to be lithographed tomorrow." 
 Variations for 2 pianos in F major, composed 1826. Listed by Louise Chopin 
 Variations on an Irish National Air (from Thomas Moore) for 2 pianos, composed 1826. Stated to be "in D Major or B minor." 
 Waltz for piano in C major, composed 1826. 
 Andante dolente for piano in B minor, composed 1827. Mentioned in the list of Louise Chopin
 Ecossaise for piano in B major, composed 1827. Mentioned in the list of Louise Chopin.
 Waltz for piano in D minor, composed 1828. Given in Louise's list, with the date, and entitled (? by Louise) 'La partenza' ('The departure') 
 Waltz for piano (supposedly) in A major, composed 1830/12 (?). Known from a letter Chopin wrote on 21 December 1830 from Vienna to his family.

Notes

See also 
 List of compositions by Frédéric Chopin by opus number
 Chopin National Edition

References

External links 
 Piano Library: Frédéric Chopin Complete list of Chopin piano works with musical extracts, difficulty ratings and recommended editions.
 The Chopin Project has more information, links, resources, and audio on demand of Chopin's solo keyboard works.
 PDF Sheet Music from the Mutopia Project

 
Lists of compositions by composer
Piano compositions by Polish composers
Lists of piano compositions by composer
Piano compositions in the Romantic era